Eiconaxius cristagalli is a species of mud lobster from the Pacific Ocean.

References

Thalassinidea
Crustaceans described in 1893
Taxa named by Walter Faxon